Palestinian (foaled 1946 at Old Hickory Farm near Lexington, Kentucky) was an American Thoroughbred racehorse whose wins included the important Brooklyn Handicap and the Jersey Stakes in which he set a new track record. In the 1949 U.S. Triple Crown series, he finished second in the Preakness Stakes and third in both the Kentucky Derby and Belmont Stakes.

Bred by longtime racing partners Isidor Bieber and trainer Hirsch Jacobs, Palestinian was raced in Bieber's name throughout his career.

In addition to racing success, Palestinian was the sire of the very good runner Promised Land who more importantly was the damsire of Hall of Fame inductee Spectacular Bid who won the Kentucky Derby and Preakness Stakes. Palestinian was also the damsire of Skip Trial who sired Hall of Fame inductee Skip Away.

Pedigree

References

1946 racehorse births
Thoroughbred racehorses
Racehorses bred in Kentucky
Racehorses trained in the United States
Horse racing track record setters
American racehorses